.bi is the Internet country code top-level domain (ccTLD) for Burundi. It is administered by the Burundi National Center of Information Technology.

The .bi domain was first delegated in October 1996. It was delegated to the entire country on July 16, 2002.

Second-level domains 
.com.bi
.co.bi
.org.bi
.or.bi
.edu.bi
.gov.bi
.info.bi

References

External links
 IANA .bi whois information

Communications in Burundi
Country code top-level domains

sv:Toppdomän#B